Robert Duncan Wilmot (1809–1891) was a Canadian politician and a Father of Confederation.

Robert Wilmot may also refer to:

Robert Duncan Wilmot Jr. (1837–1920), Canadian Member of Parliament
Robert Wilmot (playwright) (c.1550 – by 1608), Church of England clergyman
Robert Wilmot (Gaelic footballer) (born 1954), former Irish sportsperson
Sir Robert Wilmot, 1st Baronet (1708–1772), Secretary to the Lord Chamberlain of the Household
Sir Robert Wilmot, 2nd Baronet (c. 1752–1834), Secretary to the Lord Lieutenant of Ireland
Robert Wilmot-Horton (1784–1841), Governor of Ceylon
Sir Robert Wilmot, 4th Baronet of the Wilmot baronets